Acyphoderes aurulenta is a species of beetle in the family Cerambycidae. It was described by William Kirby in 1818.

References

Acyphoderes
Beetles described in 1818